Sung-Won Yang is a South Korean cellist who performs worldwide as a soloist and as a chamber musician. He studied with Philippe Muller and Janos Starker, and graduated from the Conservatoire National Supérieur de Musique de Paris.

He has collaborated with many musicians such as Christoph Eschenbach, MyungWhun Chung, Peter Eötvös, Johannes Kalitzke, Laurent Petitgirard, and Pascal Devoyon.

Since 2009, he is a founding member of the Trio Owon with violinist Olivier Charlier and pianist Emmanuel Strosser. 

He is also a regular concert and recording partner of pianist Enrico Pace.

His all-Kodály debut album was chosen as Editor's Choice of the month by Gramophone Magazine (2003) and a Critic's Choice of the year by Gramophone (2003). He has also recorded works by Rachmaninoff, Chopin and Liszt, Bach, Beethoven, Dvorák, Elgar and Schumann for EMI and Universal Music / Decca.

He has served as a juror at the Banff International Chamber Music Competition in Canada, the André Navarra International Cello Competition in France, the Cassado International Cello Competition in Japan  and the Tongyeong International Competition in Korea

He is currently a professor of cello at Yonsei University School of Music in Seoul, visiting professor in Residence at the Royal Academy of Music in London.
He is also the artistic Director of the Festival Beethoven à Beaune, in France, and of Music in PyeongChang Festival.

He is recipient of Chevalier des Arts et des Lettres by the French government.

Discography
2002 : Kodály - Music For Cello And Piano. With Ick-Choo Moon (piano). Editor's Choice of the month by Gramophone Magazine (2003) and a Critic's Choice of the year by Gramophone (2003).
2010 : Dvořák - Cello Concerto / Piano Trio "Dumky". With the Czech Philharmonic Orchestra (Conductor : Znedek Macal) 
2011 : Musical Getaway. With Les Bons Becs
2017 : J.S.Bach - Cello Suites

With Enrico Pace
2014 : Brahms Schumann - Complete Works For Cello And Piano. With Enrico Pace (piano)
2018 : Franz Liszt & Frédéric Chopin - Cantique d'Amour. With Enrico Pace (piano)
2022 : Beethoven - Complete Works For Cello And Piano. With Enrico Pace (piano)

With Trio Owon
2010 : Schubert – sonate pour violoncelle et piano ‘arpeggione’ et trio en mi bémol majeur op. 100
2011 : Schubert, Dvorák - Piano Trios
2013 : Beethoven - Piano Trio Op.97 ‘Archduke’ - Piano Trio In E Flat Major Op.70
2015 : complete Beethoven trio 
2016 : Olivier Messiaen, Quatuor pour la fin du temps - Gounod, L’anniversaire Des Martyrs / Chant pour le départ des missionnaires.

References

External links
Sung-Won Yang official website https://www.sungwonyang.com
Trio Owon official website https://trio-owon.com
Discogs page https://www.discogs.com/fr/artist/1506700-Sung-Won-Yang

Year of birth missing (living people)
Living people
South Korean cellists
Academic staff of Yonsei University
South Korean expatriates in the United Kingdom